The Anti-Money Laundering Council (AMLC) is the agency of the Government of the Philippines that is tasked to implement the provisions of Republic Act No. 9160, also known as the “Anti-Money Laundering Act of 2001” (AMLA), as amended, and Republic Act No. 10168, also known as the “Terrorism Financing Prevention and Suppression Act of 2012” (TFPSA).

It serves as the Philippines' central anti-money laundering/counter-terrorism financing (AML/CTF) authority. As such, it functions as the AML/CTF regulator and supervisor, financial intelligence unit, and primary law enforcement agency of the Philippines against money laundering and terrorist financing.

The AMLC may refer to (1) the government agency or (2) the Council, which heads the said government agency.

Mandate

The AMLC is mandated to implement the AMLA and TFPSA, in accordance with the following State policies:

AMLA
 To protect and preserve the integrity of the Philippine financial system, including the confidentiality of bank accounts.
 To ensure that the Philippines shall not be used as a money laundering site for the proceeds of any unlawful activity.
 To extend cooperation, consistent with Philippines’ foreign policy, in transnational investigations and prosecutions of persons involved in money laundering activities wherever committed.

TFPSA
 To protect life, liberty and property from acts of terrorism and to condemn terrorism and those who support and finance it; and to recognize it as inimical and dangerous to national security and the welfare of the people; and to make the financing of terrorism a crime against the Filipino people, against humanity and against the law of nations.
 To recognize and to adhere to international commitments to combat the financing of terrorism, specifically to the International Convention for the Suppression of the Financing of Terrorism, as well as other binding terrorism related resolutions of the United Nations Security Council, pursuant to Chapter 7 of the United Nations Charter.
 To reinforce the fight against terrorism by preventing and suppressing the commission of said offenses through freezing and forfeiture of property or funds while protecting human rights.

The council
The council is composed of the governor of the Bangko Sentral ng Pilipinas (BSP) as chairman, and the commissioner of the Insurance Commission (IC) and the chairperson of the Securities and Exchange Commission (SEC) as members. It acts unanimously in the discharge of its functions.

Historical composition

2001–2004:
 Rafael Buenaventura (BSP, July 1999– )
 Lilia R. Bautista (SEC, 2000 – August 2004)
 Eduardo T. Malinis (IC, April 1962 – )

2004:
 Rafael Carlos B. Buenaventura (BSP, July 1999 – July 2005)
 Fe B. Barin (SEC, Sep. 2004 – )
 Eduardo T. Malinis (IC, April 1962 – July 2004)

2004–2005:
 Amando Tetangco, Jr. (BSP, July 2005 – )
 Fe B. Barin (SEC, Sep. 2004 – )
 Benjamin S. Santos (IC, August 2004 – October 2005)

2005–2007:
 Amando M. Tetangco, Jr. (BSP, July 2005 – )
 Fe B. Barin (SEC, Sep. 2004 – )
 Evangeline C. Escobillo (IC, October 2005 – August 2007)

2007–2010:
 Amando M. Tetangco, Jr. (BSP, July 2005 – )
 Fe B. Barin (SEC, Sep. 2004 -)
 Eduardo T. Malinis (IC, August 2007 – February 2010)

2010:
 Amando M. Tetangco, Jr. (BSP, July 2005 – )
 Fe B. Barin (SEC, Sep. 2004 -)
 Santiago J. Ranada (IC, February 2010 – July 2010)

2011:
 Amando M. Tetangco, Jr. (BSP, July 2005 – July 2011, 2 July 2011 – )
 Fe B. Barin (SEC, September 2004 – March 2011)
 Emmanuel F. Dooc (IC, January 2011 – )

2011–2016:
 Amando M. Tetangco, Jr. (BSP, July 2005 – )
 Teresita J. Herbosa (SEC, March 2011 – )
 Emmanuel F. Dooc (IC, January 2011 – 16 November 2017)

2016–2017:
 Amando M. Tetangco, Jr. (BSP, July 2005 – 2 July 2017)
 Teresita J. Herbosa (SEC, March 2011 – )
 Dennis B. Funa [IC, 16 November 2016 – 23 December 2018 (Officer-in-Charge), 23 December 2016 – ]

2017–2018:
 Nestor Espenilla, Jr. (BSP, 2 July 2017 – )
 Teresita J. Herbosa [SEC, March 2011 – 11 March 2018, 11 March 2018 – 6 June 2018 (Hold-over)]
 Dennis B. Funa [IC, 16 November 2016 – 23 December 2018 (Officer-in-Charge), 23 December 2016 – ]

2017–2019:
 Nestor A. Espenilla, Jr. (BSP, 2 July 2017 – 23 February 2019)
 Emilio B. Aquino (SEC, 6 June 2018 – )
 Dennis B. Funa (IC, 23 December 2016 – )

(2019–2022:
 Benjamin Diokno (BSP, 4 March 2019 – 29 June 2022)
 Emilio B. Aquino (SEC, 6 June 2018 – present)
 Dennis B. Funa (IC, 23 December 2016 – present)

Present:
 Felipe Medalla (BSP, 30 June 2022 – present)
 Emilio B. Aquino (SEC, 6 June 2018 – present)
 Dennis B. Funa (IC, 23 December 2016 – present)

Organizational structure

The AMLC is headed by the council. The chief executive officer of the AMLC is the executive director.

The AMLC consists of three major operational units:

 Office of the Executive Director (OED)
 Detection and Prevention Department (DPD)
 Investigation and Enforcement Department (IED)

Under the OED are the following functional groups/units:

 Administrative, Financial and Information Technology Group (AFITSG)
 Commitments and Policy Group (CPG)
 Counseling, Adjudication, and Mutual Legal Assistance Unit (CAMU)
 Enterprise Technology Management Group (ETMG)

Under the DPD are the following functional groups/units:

 Financial Intelligence and Analysis Group (FIAG)
 Compliance and Supervision Group (CSG)

Under the IED are the following functional groups/units:

 Financial Crimes Investigation Group (FCIG)
 Litigation and Evaluation Group (LEG)

Executive directors

Rule 6, Section 2 of the 2018 Implementing Rules and Regulations, in relation to Section 8 of Republic Act No. 9160, as amended, states that the Executive Director shall be the chief executive officer of the AMLC. The following are the past and present Executive Directors of the AMLC:

 (Ret.) Judge Pio C. Guerrero
November 2001 – May 2002

 Atty. Vicente S. Aquino
May 2002 – March 2013

 Atty. Julia C. Bacay-Abad
March 2013 – 31 January 2017

 Atty. Mel Georgie B. Racela
01 February 2017 – 10 August 2017 (as Officer-in-Charge); 18 August 2017 – 17 August 2022

 Atty. Matthew M. David18 August 2022 – 17 August 2027''

Laws and Rules Covering the AMLC
 Republic Act No. 9160 – Anti-Money Laundering Act (AMLA) of 2001
 Republic Act No. 9194 – Amending the AMLA
 Republic Act No. 10167 – Strengthening the AMLA
 Republic Act No. 10365 – Further Strengthening the AMLA
 Republic Act No. 10927 – Designating Casinos as Covered Persons under the AMLA
 Republic Act No. 11521 – Further Strengthening the AMLA
 2016 Revised Implementing Rules and Regulations of Republic Act No. 9160, As Amended (2016 RIRR)
 2018 Implementing Rules and Regulations of Republic Act No. 9160, As Amended (2018 IRR) (January 2021 Update)
 Casino Implementing Rules and Regulations of Republic Act No. 10927 (CIRR)
 Anti-Money Laundering/Counter-Terrorism Financing Guidelines for Designated Non-Financial Businesses and Professions (DNFBP Guidelines)
 Rules of Procedure in Administrative Cases under Republic Act No. 9160, as Amended (RPAC)
 A.M. No. 05-11-04-SC – Rule of Procedure in Cases of Civil Forfeiture, Asset Preservation, and Freezing of Monetary Instrument, Property, or Proceeds Representing, Involving, or Relating to an Unlawful Activity or Money Laundering Offense under Republic Act No. 9160, as Amended.
 Republic Act No. 10168 – Terrorism Financing Prevention and Suppression Act of 2012
 Implementing Rules and Regulations of Republic Act No. 10168

References

External links
AMLC Official Website
Republic Act No. 9160 (2001)
Republic Act 9194 (2003)
Republic Act No. 10167 (2012)
Republic Act No. 10365 (2013)
Republic Act No. 10927 (2017)

Department of Finance (Philippines)
Economy of the Philippines
Philippines
2001 establishments in the Philippines
Government agencies established in 2001
Securities (finance)